Paternoster Vents, sometimes referred to as simply Vents and also known as Angel's Wings, is an outdoor 2002 stainless steel sculpture by Thomas Heatherwick, installed on the west side of the Paternoster Square development in London, United Kingdom, close to the junction of Warwick Lane and Ave Maria Lane with Amen Corner. The sculpture provides ventilation for an underground electrical substation. 

It has been described by The Guardian as "one of Thomas Heatherwick’s earliest and most successful projects".
It won Design and Art Directions' "wood pencil" award for design in 2002.

The sculpture was commissioned by Stanhope and Mitsubishi Estate, who jointly developed the Paternoster Square site, to provide ventilation for a subsurface electrical substation with four electricity transformers under Bishop’s Court on the west side of the development. Thomas Heatherwick's design reduces the physical mass of the structure as originally conceived, with metal grilles integrated into the paving allow ingress of cool air, with warm air flowing out through the two tall vents which form wings that mirror each other. The design was inspired by origami experiments from folding pieces of A4 paper. The outer surface was given a satin finish by shot blasting with glass beads.

See also

 2002 in art
 List of public art in the City of London

References

  Vents, paternostersquare.info
 Paternoster Vents, Heatherwick Studio 
 London Public Art: The Paternoster Vents, ianvisits.co.uk
 Secret Worlds Hidden Beneath Surface Structures, The Historic England Blog, heritagecalling.com
 Designer Thomas Heatherwick (architectsjournal.co.uk)
 Vents (Angel Wings), artuk.org 
 Paternoster Vents, packmanlucas.co.uk

External links
 

2002 establishments in England
2002 sculptures
Buildings and structures in the City of London
Outdoor sculptures in London
Stainless steel sculptures
Steel sculptures in England